"Kick It" is a song by English rapper Scrufizzer. It was released on 4 October 2013. The track was produced by Zed Bias. The song reached number 62 in the UK Singles Chart.

Music video
The official video for "Kick It" premiered on 18 August 2013, at a total length of 3 minutes and 41 seconds. An acoustic A64 of the song was filmed for SB.TV in which Scrufizzer also freestyled.

Track listing

Chart performance

Release history

References

2013 singles
2013 songs
Scrufizzer songs
Hip house songs